Triphenylmethane, or triphenyl methane, is the hydrocarbon with the formula (C6H5)3CH. This colorless solid is soluble in nonpolar organic solvents and not in water. Triphenylmethane is the basic skeleton of many synthetic dyes called triarylmethane dyes, many of them are pH indicators, and some display fluorescence. A trityl group in organic chemistry is a triphenylmethyl group Ph3C, e.g. triphenylmethyl chloride (trityl chloride) and the triphenylmethyl radical (trityl radical).

Preparation

Triphenylmethane was first synthesized in 1872 by the German chemist August Kekulé and his Belgian student Antoine Paul Nicolas Franchimont (1844–1919) by heating diphenylmercury (Hg(C6H5)2, Quecksilberdiphenyl) with benzal chloride (C6H5CHCl2, Benzylenchlorid).

Triphenylmethane can be synthesized by Friedel–Crafts reaction from benzene and chloroform with aluminium chloride catalyst:
3 C6H6 + CHCl3 → Ph3CH + 3 HCl
Alternatively, benzene may react with carbon tetrachloride using the same catalyst to obtain the triphenylmethyl chloride–aluminium chloride adduct, which is hydrolyzed with dilute acid:
3 C6H6 + CCl4 + AlCl3 → Ph3CCl·AlCl3
Ph3CCl·AlCl3 + HCl → Ph3CH

Synthesis from benzylidene chloride, prepared from benzaldehyde and phosphorus pentachloride, is used as well.

Reactions of C-H bond
The Ph3C-H bond is relatively weak, with a bond dissociation energy (BDE) of 81 kcal/mol, or about 24 kcal/mol less than methane.  Correspondingly, triphenylmethane is mildly acidic, with a pKa of 33.3. 

Triphenylmethane is significantly more acidic than most other hydrocarbons because the charge is delocalized over three phenyl rings. Steric effects however prevent all three phenyl rings from achieving coplanarity simultaneously. Consequently diphenylmethane is even more acidic, because in its anion the charge is spread over two phenyl rings at the same time.  

The trityl anion is isolable in crown ethers...

...and the sodium salt can also be prepared from the chloride:
(C6H5)3CCl + 2 Na → (C6H5)3CNa + NaCl

The use of tritylsodium as a strong, non-nucleophilic base has been eclipsed by the popularization of butyllithium and related strong bases.  

The unmodified anion is red, and can be used as an indicator in acid–base titrations.  Derived substances have proven useful as chemical dyes.

Triarylmethane dyes

Examples of triarylmethane dyes are bromocresol green:

And the nitrogen-bearing malachite green:

Trityl group

Protecting group
The triphenylmethyl substituent, also called trityl, is widely used in organic chemistry.  Trityl serves as a protecting group for alcohols.
 protection (requires proton acceptor): Ph3CCl  +  ROH  →  Ph3COR  +  HCl
 deprotection: Ph3COR  +  HBr  → ROH  +  Ph3CBr

Platform for unusual functional groups
Trityl derivatives of reactive functional groups are often crystalline and in some cases sterically stabilized relative to less bulky derivatives.  Three such derivatives are S-nitrosotriphenylmethanethiol (Ph3CSNO), tritylsulfenyl chloride (Ph3CSCl), and trityl sulfenamide (Ph3CSNH2).

See also
Tetraphenylmethane
Triphenylmethanol
Triphenylmethyl chloride
Triphenylmethyl hexafluorophosphate
Triphenylmethyl radical

References

Aromatic hydrocarbons
Phenyl compounds